Hoseynabad-e Serkan (also Romanized as Ḩoseynābād-e Serkān; also known as Hasanābād, Ḩoseynābād, and Ḩoseynābād Mehrkān) is a village in Solgi Rural District, Khezel District, Nahavand County, Hamadan Province, Iran. At the 2006 census, its population was 108, in 25 families.

References 

Populated places in Nahavand County